Mellen is a city in Ashland County in the U.S. state of Wisconsin. The population was 731 at the 2010 census.

Attractions
Copper Falls State Park is located just north of Mellen.

Government 

Mellen has a mayor-council form of government. 

According to the Mellen Weekly-Record; Vol.123 No. 29; Wednesday, July 20, 2022, Mayor Joseph A. Barabe, resigned effective at noon, on July 15, 2022.  No further explanation was given.

The Mellen City Council is considering changing the form of government.  Mellen currently has a Mayor-Council  form of government.  The city council is considering three options.  The first option is to remain with the Mayor-Council form of government.  The second option is to establish the position of City Administrator, who operates under the Mayor.  The third option is to abolish the Office of Mayor and establish a Manager-Council type of government.

In the Wisconsin State Legislature, Mellen is located in the 74th Assembly District, and the 25th Senate District, represented by Assembly Representative Chanz Green and State Senator Romaine Quinn

In the United States House of Representatives, Mellen is served by Tom Tiffany, of Wisconsin's 7th congressional district.

Mayors

Geography
Mellen is located at  (46.324288, -90.659295), along the Bad River.

Demographics

2010 census
As of the census of 2010, there were 731 people, 337 households, and 182 families living in the city. The racial makeup of the city was 97.1% White, 0.3% African American, 1.2% Native American, 0.1% Asian, 0.3% from other races, and 1.0% from two or more races. Hispanic or Latino of any race were 1.6% of the population.

There were 337 households, of which 24.9% had children under the age of 18 living with them, 38.6% were married couples living together, 11.0% had a female householder with no husband present, 4.5% had a male householder with no wife present, and 46.0% were non-families. 40.4% of all households were made up of individuals, and 15.7% had someone living alone who was 65 years of age or older. The average household size was 2.08 and the average family size was 2.77.

The median age in the city was 46.5 years. 20.7% of residents were under the age of 18; 6.4% were between the ages of 18 and 24; 20.6% were from 25 to 44; 30.1% were from 45 to 64; and 22.2% were 65 years of age or older. The gender makeup of the city was 49.4% male and 50.6% female.

2000 census
As of the census of 2000, there were 845 people, 378 households, and 215 families living in the city. The population density was 456.5 people per square mile (176.4/km2). There were 436 housing units at an average density of 235.5 per square mile (91.0/km2). The racial makeup of the city was 96.57% White, 0.24% African American, 1.66% Native American, 0.12% Asian, 0.12% Pacific Islander, 0.36% from other races, and 0.95% from two or more races. Hispanic or Latino of any race were 0.95% of the population.

There were 378 households, out of which 23.8% had children under the age of 18 living with them, 46.3% were married couples living together, 7.7% had a female householder with no husband present, and 43.1% were non-families. 39.7% of all households were made up of individuals, and 22.0% had someone living alone who was 65 years of age or older. The average household size was 2.15 and the average family size was 2.89.

In the city, the population was spread out, with 20.6% under the age of 18, 7.1% from 18 to 24, 26.2% from 25 to 44, 21.8% from 45 to 64, and 24.4% who were 65 years of age or older. The median age was 43 years. For every 100 females, there were 98.4 males. For every 100 females age 18 and over, there were 91.7 males.

The median income for a household in the city was $31,917, and the median income for a family was $41,111. Males had a median income of $30,804 versus $21,042 for females. The per capita income for the city was $16,297. About 1.4% of families and 5.9% of the population were below the poverty line, including 5.6% of those under age 18 and 10.2% of those age 65 or over.

Transportation
Bus service is provided by Bay Area Rural Transit.

Notable people
Robert F. Barabe, politician, Wisconsin State Assembly
D. E. Bowe, politician, Wisconsin State Assembly
Bernard E. Gehrmann, politician, Wisconsin State Assembly
Bernard J. Gehrmann, politician, United States House of Representatives and Wisconsin Legislature

Images

See also
 List of cities in Wisconsin

References

External links

 Mellen, Wisconsin Chamber of Commerce
 Sanborn fire insurance maps: 1909 1917

Cities in Wisconsin
Cities in Ashland County, Wisconsin